66th meridian may refer to:

66th meridian east, a line of longitude east of the Greenwich Meridian
66th meridian west, a line of longitude west of the Greenwich Meridian